Louise Ekland (born 22 July 1978) is a British television presenter active on the French media. After presenting on France Télévisions, BFM TV and the M6 Group, she joined France 3 in 2017.

Television career 
From 2005 to 2006, Louise Ekland presented Le big show on Game One and Play hit from 2006 to 2007. In late 2007, she joined Direct 8 to present On aura tout vu in the early evening. From 2007 to 2008, she presented M6 music hits flash on M6 from Monday to Friday in the early morning and then the chronicle Le Morning.

In 2008, she joined France Télévisions to present on France 2 the program Cote & Match, dedicated to lottery games with sport prognostics of the Française des Jeux. The same year, she joined the news channel BFM TV to present a chronicle on show business from Monday to Friday.

In 2009, while still presenting on BFM TV, she presents on France 4 the FA Cup. Since April 2009, succeeding to Ray Cokes, she presents on the same channel the musical program Louise Contre Attaque, which covers different musical festivals. In December 2010, she participated at the presentation of the Telethon on France Télévisions. In February 2011, she presents Frog & Rosbif with Énora Malagré on France 4. In March 2011, she participated as a member of the jury in the French version of Top Chef on M6.

In 2012 while still on BFM TV where she presents a daily program in the evening, she presented in May La Nuit Doctor Who on France 4 and during the 2012 Summer Olympics in London, she visits the city in a bus every morning at the preamble of the sports broadcasts on France Télévisions.

In June 2012, she participated at the game Fort Boyard for the association "Enfants de la Lune" with Nelson Monfort, Stéphane Diagana, Frédérique Jossinet, Richard Dacoury and Jérôme Alonzo.

In September 2012, she joined the team of the talk show C à vous on France 5 and also participated as a guest in many programs of the public service like Oh les filles or Toute la télé chante pour Sidaction.

In July 2014, she presented the daily program 100% Mag on M6, and then replacing Faustine Bollaert since September until the end of the broadcast in November of that year. She has also replaced Sandrine Corman at the presentation of La France a un incroyable talent.

In September 2017, she returns on France Télévisions to present the program On a la solution ! on France 3 on Saturday morning.

References

External links 

1978 births
English expatriates in France
Television presenters from Liverpool
Living people